Blue sedge is a common name for several plants and may refer to:

Caex firma, certain cultivars are known as blue sedge
Carex flacca (syn. Carex glauca), native to Europe and North Africa, and cultivated as an ornamental
Carex glaucodes, native to eastern North America